Amblychia moltrechti is a moth of the  family Geometridae. It is found in south-east Asia, including Borneo and Taiwan.

References

Moths described in 1909
Boarmiini
Moths of Asia